The third season of High School Musical: The Musical: The Series, an American mockumentary musical drama streaming television series created by Tim Federle, premiered on Disney+ on July 27, 2022; the season consisted of 8 episodes that released weekly until September 14. The series itself is inspired by the High School Musical film series. In this season, some of the East High drama club spend their summer at Camp Shallow Lake, which is putting on an adaptation of the 2013 film Frozen, and become the subjects of a Disney+ documentary directed by Corbin Bleu. Meanwhile, Nini sets a course for her future.

Much of the main cast from the first two seasons returns. Mark St. Cyr, who was a main cast member in the first two seasons, does not appear in this season, while fellow main cast members Olivia Rodrigo and Kate Reinders recur, and Larry Saperstein and Joe Serafini guest star. This is the first main cast appearance of Saylor Bell Curda and Adrian Lyles, and the final appearance of Rodrigo. The series was renewed for a fourth season by Disney+ in May 2022.

Episodes

Cast and characters

Main 
 Joshua Bassett as Ricky Bowen
 Sofia Wylie as Gina Porter
 Matt Cornett as E.J. Caswell
 Julia Lester as Ashlyn Caswell
 Dara Reneé as Kourtney Greene
 Frankie Rodriguez as Carlos Rodriguez
 Saylor Bell Curda as Maddox
 Adrian Lyles as Jet

Recurring 
 Jason Earles as Dewey Wood
 Corbin Bleu as a fictionalized version of himself
 Ben Stillwell as Channing
 Meg Donnelly as Val
 Aria Brooks as Alex
 Liamani Segura as Emmy
 Kate Reinders as Miss Jenn
 Olivia Rodrigo as Nini Salazar-Roberts

Guest 
 Joe Serafini as Seb Matthew-Smith
 Larry Saperstein as Big Red
 Jesse Tyler Ferguson as Marvin
 JoJo Siwa as Madison
 Kimberly Brooks as Michelle Greene
 Olivia Rose Keegan as Lily
 Nicole Sullivan as Carol
 Michelle Noh as Dana

Production

Development
In September 2021, two months after the second season concluded on Disney+, High School Musical: The Musical: The Series was renewed for a third season. Fans began to speculate that the musical would center around the Disney Channel Original Movie Camp Rock; however, in November of that year, the musical was revealed to be the stage adaptation of the 2013 film Frozen. On the camp setting for the third season, Federle stated, "We are overjoyed to be heading to the great outdoors for season three, and grateful to our partners and friends at Disney+ for their continued support of our next-generation Wildcats." He would further tell RadioTimes.com, "We wanted a big fun, summery, sunny season, that would just be good vibes. For the audience that was with us in season 2, that was in some ways a darker, more dramatic season, shot during the height of COVID. I think we were all looking for both a location change for the morale of the cast, but also the storytelling possibilities and opportunities when you get to go somewhere, like a summer camp where anything could happen, is just so fun and juicy." Federle stated the decision to have the season take place at summer camp was due largely to the COVID-19 pandemic, adding "We had a real plan for, which was: If we do Frozen, [Joshua Bassett] can sing Kristoff's lullaby, [Dara Reneé] is gonna inspire young Black princesses everywhere when they see her sing, 'Let It Go,' Sofia Wylie is gonna get to play a lighter side of Gina as Anna. There was such a plan to return to our roots of a group of theater kids putting on a show."

The season also sees Sofia Wylie's character Gina in a deteriorating relationship with Matt Cornett's character EJ, which leads to the beginning of her rekindled friendship and eventual relationship with Joshua Bassett's character Ricky, something that has been teased since the first season. On the relationship between Gina and EJ, Cornett said, "I think Gina means a lot to EJ, no matter the circumstances...I think that's something that will always weigh heavy on him is, is trying to, you know, make sure that he's still able to be around his friends and be around this girl that means so much to him." On the friendship between her and Ricky, Federle noted "They’re both outsiders. Ricky was a skater, Gina was the new girl, and they accidentally have a lot in common once they put aside their differences." With the release of the season finale "Let It Go," Gina finally confesses her feelings for Ricky and the two share a kiss. On making this decision, Federle stated, "Well, the night of Homecoming changed everything for the characters, for me as a writer...when Sofia Wylie leaned over and kissed Josh [Bassett]’s cheek in the back of that orange Bug, that changed the entire series. So the short answer is, I don’t know when I wrote the pilot if I thought Gina and Ricky would kiss in the season finale of season 3, but from Homecoming on, this was the plan."

Both Julia Lester's character Ashlyn and Larry Saperstein's character Big Red come out this season, something that was asked for by both Lester and Saperstein since the first season. According to Federle, he learned at D23 in 2019 that the actors wanted LGBT storylines, in which he said "So it’s kind of funny how the show sometimes imitates the actors’ thoughts or lives or dreams. It’s cool to be writing for Disney in an era where I feel like I’m free to tell these kinds of stories."

Casting
Much of the main cast returned for the third season, with Kate Reinders and Olivia Rodrigo recurring, Joe Serafini and Larry Saperstein guest starring, and Mark St. Cyr not appearing. This would also be the final appearance for Rodrigo on the show. On her limited appearance in this season and eventual exit from the series, Federle said, "I think [Nini's] ready to explore the world outside the halls of East High...and so this season it's about trying to give her character a proper sendoff while also leaving room for other characters to really step into the fray and step into the spotlight."

In January 2022, Corbin Bleu, Meg Donnelly, Jason Earles, Saylor Bell Curda, and Adrian Lyles were cast as a fictionalized version of himself, Val, Dewey Wood, Maddox, and Jet respectively. Bleu, Donnelly and Earles would be cast in recurring roles, while Bell Curda and Lyles would be part of the main cast. In March 2022, Ben Stillwell, Aria Brooks and Liamani Segura were cast in recurring roles as Channing, Alex and Emmy respectively. With the release of the official trailer in June 2022, Jesse Tyler Ferguson and JoJo Siwa were revealed to be part of the cast, guest starring as Marvin and Madison respectively. The release of the first episode on July 27, 2022 revealed that Olivia Rose Keegan would return to guest star as Lily, and a week later, the second episode confirmed the returns of Nicole Sullivan and Michelle Noh to guest star as Nini's mothers Carol and Dana respectively.

For the in-show production of Frozen, Gina was cast as Anna with Emmy cast as a young Anna, Kourtney was cast as Elsa with Alex cast as a young Elsa, Ricky was cast as Kristoff, E.J. was cast as Sven, Carlos was cast as Olaf, and Jet was cast as Hans, with Ashlyn being part of the ensemble. On casting Kourtney as Elsa and Gina as Anna, Federle noted, "I felt really strongly that [Dara Reneé] as Elsa would be so powerful. And then to have [Sofia Wylie] as Anna — because Sofia’s so funny, and a lot of people don’t always get to see that side of her — would be a really beautiful combination.” He would go on to add, "While I feel that romantic love is something that’s at the center of a lot of shows, I also think not enough is said about camaraderie and sisterhood among young women, who the media often tries to pit against each other. Frozen was chosen for those themes, plus the music’s incredible. It was fun to stretch outside of our High School Musical universe."

Filming
Filming for the third season had begun by January 18, 2022. Production would take place in Los Angeles as opposed to Salt Lake City to match the summer camp setting, a detail first revealed with the announcement of the renewal. Production officially wrapped on April 19, 2022.

Music

Once more, Joshua Bassett wrote a song for the soundtrack, as did Dara Reneé. Bassett co-wrote "Finally Free" with Doug Rockwell and Tova Litvin, while Reneé co-wrote "Here I Come" with Steph Jones and Anthony M. Jones. Olivia Rodrigo makes her final musical contribution to the series: an original song titled "You Never Know". The soundtrack was released digitally on all music streaming services on September 15, 2022, followed by a physical release by Target the following day.

Reception

Critical response
The review aggregator website Rotten Tomatoes reported a 100% approval rating based on 4 reviews.

Bruce Miller of the Sioux City Journal wrote, "It isn’t a huge twist on the summer formula, but it does have enough variety to suggest this season could produce a couple more breakout stars. Watch closely and an even bigger game is figuring out who will come back to visit a decade from now." Diego Peralta of Cultured Vultures stated, "The third season of High School Musical: The Musical: The Series is a joyful return for the teens of East High. With an interesting new place for summer adventures, heartwarming friendships between the characters, and emotional musical numbers, the Wildcats continue to be a lot of fun." Tessa Smith of Mama's Geeky wrote, "Tim Federle, the musical genius behind this show has done it yet again. As each episode comes to an end fans will be begging for more. With the gang putting on a production of Frozen at camp, things get interesting. Having only seen the first three episodes, we are already hooked and cannot wait to see how it all plays out."

Notes

References 

3
2022 American television seasons